(Mainland) Chinese Braille is a braille script used for Standard Mandarin in China. Consonants and basic finals conform to international braille, but additional finals form a semi-syllabary, as in zhuyin (bopomofo). Each syllable is written with up to three Braille cells, representing the initial, final, and tone, respectively. In practice tone is generally omitted as it is in pinyin.

Braille charts 
Traditional Chinese Braille is as follows:

Initials 
Chinese Braille initials generally follow the pinyin assignments of international braille. However, j, q, x are replaced with g, k, h, as the difference is predictable from the final. (This reflects the historical change of g, k, h (and also z, c, s) to j, q, x before i and ü.) ( is used for the final er, the pronunciation of the name of that letter in English Braille.)

Finals 
The finals approximate international values for several of the basic vowels ( e (o),  yi,  wo,  wu,  yü,  you,  ei), but then necessarily diverge. However, there are a few parallels with other braille alphabets:  er and  wai are pronounced like the names of those letters in English braille;  ye,  ya, and  you are pronounced like those letters in Russian Braille.  yuan,  yue,  yin, are similar to the old French pronunciations oin, ieu, in. For the most part, however, Chinese Braille finals do not obviously derive from previous conventions.

The pinyin final -i is only written where it corresponds to yi.  Otherwise* (in ci zi si ri chi zhi shi) no final is written, a convention also found in zhuyin.  The final -e is not written in  de, a common grammatical particle written with several different characters in print.

Tones 
Tone is marked sparingly.

Punctuation 
Chinese Braille punctuation approximates the form of international braille punctuation, but several spread the corresponding dots across two cells rather than one.

Numbers 
A braille cell ⠼ called number sign is needed when representing numbers.

Examples: 
  0,  1,  2, …  9,
  10,  11,  12, …  19, …  29, …  99,
  100,  256,  1024,  1048576.

Rules 
Spaces are added between words, rather than between syllables.
Tone is marked when needed. It comes after the final.
As in zhuyin, the finals of the syllables zi, ci, si, zhi, chi, shi, ri are not marked.

Two examples, the first with full tone marking, the second with tone for disambiguation only:

⠱⠂⠛⠩⠁⠀⠃⠥⠆⠀⠵⠖⠄⠀⠇⠢⠰⠂

{|
|- align=center
| ||||||
|- align=center
|  ||  ||  ||  
|- align=center
| Shíjiān ||bù ||zǎo ||le!
|- align=center
| time ||not ||early ||
|}

⠉⠖⠄⠙⠊⠆⠀⠱⠦⠀⠙⠀⠓⠿⠁⠀⠱⠆⠀⠋⠼⠀⠟⠺⠅⠪⠀⠙⠐⠆

{|
|- align=center
|  ||  ||  ||  ||  ||  ||  ||  
|- align=center
|  || || || || || || ||
|- align=center
| cǎodì ||shang ||de ||huā ||shi ||feng ||chuikai ||de.
|- align=center
| grass || above || which || flower || is || wind ||  || by
|}

Ambiguity 
Chinese Braille has the same low level of ambiguity that pinyin does. In practice, tone is omitted 95% of the time, which leads to a space saving of a third. Tone is also omitted in pinyin military telegraphy, and causes little confusion in context.

The initial pairs g/j, k/q, h/x are distinguished by the final: initials j, q, x are followed by the vowels i or ü, while the initials g, k, h are followed by other vowels. This reflects the historical derivation of j, q, x from g, k, h before i and ü, and parallels the dual pronunciations of c and g in Spanish and Italian. In pinyin, the redundancy is resolved in the other direction, with the diaeresis omitted from ü after j, q, x. Thus braille  is equivalent to pinyin ju: 
 gu, 
 ju.

Usage 
The China Library for the Blind in Beijing has several thousand volumes, mostly published by the China Braille Press. The National Taiwan Library has a Braille room with a postal mail service and some electronic documents.

See also 

 Two-cell Chinese Braille
 Taiwanese Braille
 Cantonese Braille
 Moon type is a simplification of the Latin alphabet for embossing. An adaptation for Ningbo-reading blind people has been proposed.

Notes

References

Further reading 
 [Original from Columbia University; digitized August 18, 2009]

External links

Omniglot: Braille for Chinese
学点盲文
Braille at the Dongli Disabled Persons' Federation 

French-ordered braille scripts
Transcription of Chinese